The 2020 Treviso Open (sometimes known as the 2020 Dynamic Billard Italian Open) was a professional nine-ball pool event, the only Euro Tour tournament held in 2020. The event was played from 20 to 22 February 2020 at the BHR Treviso Hotel in Treviso, Italy. The event had a total prize pool of €38,000, with the winner of each event receiving €4,500.

The defending champion was Konrad Juszczyszyn, who had defeated Ivar Saris in the previous year's final, but was eliminated in the double-elimination round. The men's event was won by Jayson Shaw, who defeated Eklent Kaçi in the final 9–8. Kristina Tkach was the defending champion of the women's event, having defeated Marharyta Fefilava in the previous year's final. Tkach, however, lost in the quarter-finals to Aleksandra Guleikova. Jasmin Ouschan met Guleikova in the final, and won 7–1. Planned future Euro Tour tournaments in 2020 were cancelled due to the COVID-19 pandemic.

Tournament format
The Treviso Open was the first and only Euro Tour event held in 2020, and was played from 20 to 22 February 2020 at the BHR Treviso Hotel in Treviso, Italy, and was played on 21 tables. A nine-ball pool event for both men and women were first played as a double-elimination tournament, with the men's event becoming a single-elimination bracket at the round-of-32, while the women's event remained a double-elimination tournament until the round-of-16.  All men's matches were played as -to-nine , whilst the women's matches were race-to-seven racks. The men's defending champion was Konrad Juszczyszyn, who had defeated Ivar Saris 9–6 in the 2019 Treviso Open final. Russia's Kristina Tkach was the defending champion of the women's event, having defeated Marharyta Fefilava 7–5 in the previous year's final . Due to the COVID-19 pandemic, planned future Euro Tour tournaments in 2020 were cancelled.

Prize fund 

Tournament summary

There were 211 entrants into the men's event, which began with a double-elimination round. Having been defeated by Tobias Bongers, Chris Melling was eliminated from the competition after a 8–9 loss to Thorsten Hohmann. Former European Pool Championships winner Fabio Petroni lost in his opening round 6–9 to Wilhelm Georg, but qualified for the main stages. In the loser's qualification round, Ruslan Chinakhov and Mark Gray were both defeated, by Mieszko Fortuński and Sergei Luzker.

Two former world pool champions Joshua Filler and Fedor Gorst met in the round of 32, which went , and Gorst  to win 9–8. Female player Marharyta Fefilava reached the last 32, defeating Quintin Pongers in the second loser's round to qualify. However, she lost 7–9 to Mickey Krause. Jayson Shaw defeated Albin Ouschan and Jani Uski 9–8, Tomasz Kapłan 9–4 before defeating Gorst 9–3 to reach the final. Eklent Kaçi defeated Luzker and Karol Skowerski 9–6 before completing a whitewash over Maximilian Lechner 9–0. Kaçi then beat Mateusz Śniegocki 9–6 to reach the final. The final, contested between Shaw and Kaçi, saw Kaçi lead 8–7. Shaw won the rack, and then the decider to win his first Euro Tour event.

There were 48 entries into the women's event. Oliwia Zalewska, who had won the previous two Euro Tour event's completed two 7–6 victories over Lynn Pijpers and Valeriia Trushevskaia to qualify for the last 16. The highest ranked player, Kristina Tkach won over Elise Qiu and Monika Zabek. The second highest ranked player, Jasmin Ouschan won both her qualifying matches 7–2.

Defending champion Kristina Tkach completed a whitewash over Tina Vogelmann, but lost in the quarter-finals to Aleksandra Guleikova. Having defeated Bojana Sarac 7–5 in the last 16, Guleikova beat Ina Kaplan 7–3 to reach the final. Ouschan defeated Yini Gaspar, Kateryna Zlateva and Vania Franco to reach the final. Ouschan won the final 7–1 and commented that the event was "preparation" for events later in the year.

Results

Men's competition
The results for the men's knockout round is shown below. Players in bold denote match winners.

Women's competition
The following results are from the knockout stages following the round of 16. Players in bold denote match winners:

References

External links

 Official Website

2020 Euro Tour events
2020 in Italian sport
International sports competitions hosted by Italy
February 2020 sports events in Italy
Sports competitions in Treviso